Saint-Tite is a town in the province of Quebec, Canada, north of Trois-Rivières, in the Mékinac Regional County Municipality (RCM) and in the Mauricie administrative region. In the 19th Century, the Batiscanie economy was mainly founded on forestry and agriculture. With many small businesses, Saint-Tite expanded through the production of leather goods and various types of shops. Saint-Tite became a capital of the region, especially concerning education, health and social services. Today, tourism counts as an important economic activity. Its chief industries were forestry, agriculture and leather goods production.

Western Festival
The city of Saint-Tite is particularly known for the Festival Western de Saint-Tite, which takes place for 10 days in September every year. The Festival Western de Saint-Tite was developed from a rodeo inaugurated in 1967 to promote the leather industry. The Festival Western de Saint-Tite is the largest Western attraction in Eastern Canada. This festival of Eastern style, under the epithet Western, has an international reputation. The festival's success has led to the remodeling of some of the town's infrastructures to resemble a western frontier town of the late nineteenth or early twentieth centuries.

Since 1999, the Rodeo of Festival Western de Saint-Tite is awarded as the "Best outdoor rodeo in Americas". The festival features a variety of activities that take place at a rate of horsemen and the sound of country music and in Eastern decor: competition, conference, parade, tasting, demonstrations, exhibitions, shows, etc... The horsemen and women can participate in various tests of skill on the Monte horse or wild bull (with or without a saddle). They can participate in speed events, such as steer socket, or skill tests, such as the race between barrels.

During the 10 days of the Festival, several events take place in the various marquees erected around the city or at the Country Club Desjardins, a site that looks like a typical western town. The festival is marked by a country western character. The "Galaxie Rising Star Award" awarded at the Festival contributes to the development of musical talent in the country western area.

Toponymy
The mission of Saint-Just-de-Kapibouska was established in 1851 around Lake Kapibouska, on the site of the present city of Saint-Tite. In Algonquin language, Kapibouska name means "where there are reeds". In 1859, the Bishop of Trois-Rivières had retained the surname Saint-Tite for canonical foundation. The civil erection of the parish municipality occurred in 1863. The parish was named in honor of Titus, Apostle and companion of Paul, Bishop of Knossos.

Geography
Saint-Tite is located 30 km northeast of Shawinigan. The territory of 92.53 km2 is situated in the Mauricie region and the Mékinac Regional County Municipality. It shares its borders with the municipalities of Sainte-Thècle, Grandes-Piles, Hérouxville, Saint-Adelphe and Proulxville.

The city is located in the lowlands of the St. Lawrence valley. The terrain is generally flat with some hills. The northwest marks the boundary with the Laurentians. The altitude in the municipality is from 110 to 309 m. The bedrock consists of Precambrian gneiss.

The city is crossed by the Rivière des Envies, a tributary of the Batiscan River. Rivière des Envies has its source at Lake Traverse in Sainte-Thècle and enters at the northern part (in "Grand marais" sector) of the territory of Saint-Tite. It crosses the municipality through the city, then heads to Proulxville.

The Saint-Tite has several lakes, the largest being Lake Pierre-Paul which discharges into the Pierre-Paul river. This small river crosses rang St-Thomas-South (Sainte-Thècle), then rang St-Émile (Saint-Adelphe), before emptying into the Batiscan River in village of (Saint-Adelphe).

In Saint-Tite, during Spring floods or heavy rains, the risk of immersion are high on 3.4 km2 of land. Areas prone to floods correspond to Prairie Creek (a tributary of the Rivière des Envies) and the area of the former Kapibouska lake (southwest of the city). The floods affect agricultural land as well as residential sectors.

Saint-Tite is crossed by roads 153 and 159. The first connects with Shawinigan Saint-Tite and Lac-aux-Sables. The second allows you to travel to Saint-Roch-de-Mékinac and Sainte-Anne-de-la-Pérade. The city is also served by a railway going to Montreal, Saguenay and Senneterre.

History
The first inhabitant Indians to settle permanently in the area that would become Saint-Tite were Métis, Montagnais and Algonquins who lived in the vicinity of Lake Kapibouska. This stretch of water that lies south-west of the village, was formed by a bulge in the Rivière-des-Envies caused by large beaver dams. The non-Aboriginal settlers contributed to the disappearance of the lake by the demolition of the dams to counteract the adverse effects of spring flooding on agriculture, transport and surrounding buildings.

The first settlers from Sainte-Geneviève-de-Batiscan, Champlain, Grondines, Neuville and Saint-Augustin-de-Desmaures settled in 1833 around the Lake Kapibouska. A Catholic mission, Saint-Just-de-Kapibouska, was established in 1851. The parish of Saint-Tite was incorporated on 11 July 1863. The population of the municipality progressed to 3 000 in 1900. On 4 June 1910, the city of Saint-Tite broke away from the parish. The two were merged December 23, 1998.

Slogan of the city
Union in action

Coat of arms
The coat of arms of the city was adopted in 1954 by the city council.

The coat of arms of Saint-Tite is blazoned thus:
Greek cross gules a chief azure point, flanked by a toothed wheel segment money dexter and a gear segment sinister gold, containing a skin tight leather gold dextral and sinistral spruce money, overcoming mountains of sand placed on a terrace or charged with a blue river.

Demographics 

Population trend:

Note: The two municipalities were merged in 1998.

According to the 2006 census:
 Less than 1% of the population is immigrant.
 31% of the population over 15 years has no diploma.
 7% of the population over 15 years has a degree of higher education.
 60.2% of the population of Saint-Tite is urban. The urban area of Saint-Tite has a population of 2,306 and an area of 2.58 km2 in 2006, or a density of 893.8 inhabitants/km2.
 Private dwellings occupied by usual residents in 2011: 1846 (total dwellings: 2155)

Mother language of Saint-Tite's citizens:

Almost all of the population speaks French as a mother tongue:
 16.2% of the population masters both official languages of Canada.
 French as first language: 98.6%
 English as first language: 0%
 English and French as first language: 0.3%
 Other as first language: 1.1%

Attractions 
Saint-Tite is particularly known for its western festival which has taken place every September since 1967. In 2008, the festival attracted 585,581 visitors.
École Emilie Bordeleau, who inspired the novels of Arlette Cousture "Les Filles de Caleb", is located in Saint-Tite.

Notable people 

 Julie Boulet, politician, member of the Liberal Party of Quebec.
 Gratien Gélinas (1909-1999), playwright and actor.

Novels about Saint-Tite
Saint-Tite is an important part of the novel Les Filles de Caleb (Caleb's daughters), written by novelist Arlette Cousture. The backstory of this novel is based on the life of Émilie Bordeleau, a country school teacher who taught and lived with her children in schools in the area.

Publications on the history of Saint-Tite 
 "Histoire de Saint-Tite 1833-1984 (History of Saint-Tite 1833-1984)" (second edition). Published in 1984 in French by Éditions Souvenance Inc and Historical Committee. 471 pages. Book Committee: Raymonde Rompré-LeBrun, Gisèle St-Amant-Matton, Gérard Brunelle, Marielle Brouillette, Louise Nobert-Béland, Pierre LeBrun, Jean-Pierre Paquet. Member of the "History of Saint-Tite" project sponsored by "Development Canada Community Project": Cécile Gélinas, Cécile Chaillé-Trépanier and Pierrette Délisle. Old photographs reproduced largely by Michel Pothier.
 "Répertoire des naissances et des baptêmes de Saint-Tite de Champlain 1859-1940 (Directory of births and baptisms of St. Tite de Champlain 1859-1940)", compiled by Jacques Delisle. Published in French.
 "Répertoire des mariages de la paroisse Saint-Tite de Champlain: 1859-1959 (Directory of marriages of the parish Saint-Tite de Champlain: 1859-1959)", Campagna, Dominique. Cap-de-la-Madeleine, s.n., 1968. 186 p.
 "Répertoire des décès et des sépultures de Saint-Tite de Champlain 1859-1940 (Directory death and burial of St. Tite de Champlain 1859-1940)", compiled by Jacques Delisle, 135 pages.

See also 
 Batiscanie, Quebec
 Rivière des Envies
 Batiscan River
 Pierre-Paul River
 Little Mékinac North River
 Lake Roberge (Grandes-Piles)
 Mékinac Regional County Municipality

References

External links 
 City of Saint-Tite of Champlain (Ville de Saint-Tite de Champlain):  

Cities and towns in Quebec
Incorporated places in Mauricie
Mékinac Regional County Municipality